"Bop" (stylized in all caps) is a song by American rapper DaBaby, released to US rhythmic contemporary radio through Interscope Records and South Coast Music Group on November 19, 2019, as the second single from DaBaby's sophomore album Kirk (2019). It peaked at number 11 on the US Billboard Hot 100. The song received a nomination for Best Rap Performance at the 63rd Annual Grammy Awards.

Live performances
DaBaby performed the song as a part of a medley with "Intro" and "Really" on The Tonight Show Starring Jimmy Fallon on September 30, 2019, to promote Kirk.

DaBaby performed the song, along with "Suge", on the December 7, 2019, episode of Saturday Night Live.

Music video
The music video was released on November 16, 2019, and was directed by Reel Goats. It is styled as a "Broadway hip-hop musical" and features a flash mob as well as American dance crew the Jabbawockeez.  James Rico, the head of the production team Reel Goats, stated that he was inspired by the intro sequences of Austin Powers and how people would want to dance around the title character.  Rico went on to say that he wanted to recreate that same feeling of community in the music video, drawing additional inspiration from Rocky, with the end goal being a "rap version of" the intro scene from La La Land.

Charts

Weekly charts

Year-end charts

Certifications

Release history

References

2019 singles
2019 songs
DaBaby songs
Interscope Records singles
Songs written by DaBaby